Auguste Eugène Méquignon (21 February 1875, in Paris – 1958 in Paris), was a French entomologist. He specialised in Coleoptera, especially  Staphyliniformia and Cucujoidea.

He was a member of  the Société entomologique de France and was president in 1922.

Works
partial list
Many short papers (notes diverses) in Bulletin de la Société Entomologique de France and Miscellanea Entomologica
1938 with Jean Sainte-Claire Deville Catalogue raisonné des coléoptères de France Société entomologique de France, 1938 - 474 pages
1942 Voyage de MM. L. Chopard et A. Méquignon aux Açores (août-septembre 1930). XIII. Diagnoses de Coléoptères nouveaux. Bulletin de la Société Entomologique de France 47: 9–11.
1942 Voyage de MM. L. Chopard et A. Méquignon aux Açores (Aout-Septembre 1930). XIV. Catalogues des Coléoptères Açoréens. Annales de la Société Entomologique de France 111: 1–66.
1943 Notes diverses sur des Coléoptères de France. Bulletin de la Société Entomologique de France 48(11): 159–162.

References

Anonym 1958: [Mequignon, A.]  Bull. Soc. Ent. Fr., Paris 63 (7/8)	157
Constantin, R. 1992: Memorial des Coléopteristes Français. Bull. liaison Assoc. Col. reg. parisienne, Paris (Suppl. 14): 1-92 Portrait
Lhoste, J. 1987: Les entomologistes français. 1750 - 1950.  INRA (Institut National de la Recherche Agronomique), Paris : 1-355	208-209

French entomologists
Presidents of the Société entomologique de France
1958 deaths
1875 births